12000 series may refer to:

Japanese train types

 Kintetsu 12000 series EMU
 Nankai 12000 series EMU
 Semboku 12000 series EMU
 Sotetsu 12000 series EMU
 Toei 12-000 series EMU